Nocardioides zeae is a Gram-positive and aerobic bacterium from the genus Nocardioides which has been isolated from the internal stem tissue of a corn plant (Zea mays) from the Smith Research Center in Tallassee, Alabama. The major menaquinone of Nocardioides zeae is MK-8(H4).

References

External links
Type strain of Nocardioides zeae at BacDive -  the Bacterial Diversity Metadatabase	

zeae
Bacteria described in 2014